Giovambattista Scuticchio Foderaro (born 14 July 1989 in Rome) is an Italian businessman, corporate advisory strategist and philanthropist.

Early life
Foderaro was born in Rome, to an Italian noble family whose ancestral seat is located mostly in Calabria. He studied at the Economy and Enterprises Management Faculty at Università Cattolica del Sacro Cuore of Rome. He then joined his family business after quitting studies in 2008.

Career

VR Group

In 2008, Foderaro founded the first firm of the group, VR - STEERING MEDIA, also known as VR Production. VR Group's first company was a Production and Brand Management company which worked for Fashion Industry and Show Business. From 2011 to 2016, Giovambattista expanded the Group of firms with three other companies which comprise today's VR league. VR Management was founded in 2011 as an international Mother Agency working in Model and Artists Management.

The VR Group expansion project saw the founding of VR Corporatenext; Corporate Advisory firm, which was established in 2015. In 2016, and VR The Incubator was developed through VR Production & Brand Management. VR Asset Management was established as a sister company.

Today the main company is VR Corporatenext, a Corporate Advisory, Management and Trade firm; a NATO Commercial and Government Entity and a UN (Unites Nations) Global Market Operator. Through VR Corporatenext, Foderaro gave birth to few cooperations with the Italian Ministry of Health during the SARS-CoV-2 pandemic and during the XVI Italian Legislature with the Ministry of Equal Opportunity.

Foderaro Group

In the Foderaro Group, his family business, Giovambattista saw his first entrepreneurial experiences. He started projects related to Maritime and Land Transport, the notable one being the "Wi-Fi On Board" project. In 2011, the idea was presented for people traveling through buses. The company, Foderaro Autoservizi, became the first one to install a Wi-Fi system on board for interregional and national routes. This system is now used by many companies across Europe. In 2012, Giovambattista and his grandfather Battista, received the Smart Move Award powered by the Associazione Nazionale Autotrasporto Viaggiatori (ANAV), for the Innovation and Renovation.

References

External links
Official website

Università Cattolica del Sacro Cuore alumni
1989 births
Living people
Italian businesspeople